Staples Hollow is a valley in Ste. Genevieve County in the U.S. state of Missouri.

Staples Hollow has the name of the Staples family of settlers.

References

Valleys of Ste. Genevieve County, Missouri
Valleys of Missouri